Liparus dirus is a species of weevils in the family Curculionidae, subfamily Molytinae.

It is mainly present in Austria, Bulgaria, Czech Republic, France, Germany, Italy, Poland, Romania, Slovenia and Spain.

Larvae and adults feed on Apiaceae species, mainly on Laserpitium latifolium, Laserpitium gallicum and Peucedanum cervaria.

The colour of this beetle is completely black, with the surface of elytra finely and densely dotted, without stains.

Subspecies 
Liparus dirus var. punctatostriatus  Bertolini, 1893

References 

 Trnka Filip -  Naturabohemica

External links 
 Biolib
 Fauna europaea
 Curci.de

Molytinae
Beetles of Europe
Beetles described in 1795